Immaterial may refer to:

 The opposite of matter, material, materialism, or materialistic
 Maya (illusion), a concept in all Indian religions, that all matter is a grand illusion
 Incorporeality
 Immaterialism, including subjective idealism (and other idealism/mentalism/spiritualism)
 Immaterial financial matters, in accounting and auditing terms
 Immaterial (collection), a 2002 short story collection by Robert Hood
 Immaterial labor
 It's Immaterial, British pop music band
"Immaterial", a song by Sophie from Oil of Every Pearl's Un-Insides